Five-O may refer to:
 Five-O, an American slang term for law enforcement
 Hawaii Five-O (1968 TV series), an American television police drama airing from 1968 to 1980
 Hawaii Five-O (album), a 1969 album by The Ventures
 Hawaii Five-0 (2010 TV series), a re-imagining of the 1968 series premiering in 2010
 Five-O (album), a 1985 Hank Williams, Jr. album
 "Five-O" (song), a 2007 single by Elephant Man from the album Let's Get Physical
 "Five-O", a 1993 song by James from the album Laid
 Five-Oh (building),  a tall residential tower in Los Angeles, California
 Ninja Five-O, a game for the Nintendo Game Boy Advance, released in 2003
 Five-O (mobile application)
 "Five-O" (Better Call Saul), a 2015 episode of Better Call Saul
 5-0 grind, a skateboarding trick
 Five-0 or 5.0, Slang for Ford's Mustang GT with a 5.0L V8 engine

See also 
 5O (disambiguation)
 O5 (disambiguation)
 50 (disambiguation)